The GAPA Launch Site and Blockhouse near Knolls in Tooele County, Utah dates from 1946.  It is a work of the Boeing Airplane Co. Facilities Dept.

It was listed on the National Register of Historic Places in 1980.  The listing included one contributing structure and one contributing site.

It is significant as the first launch site for the Ground-to-Air Pilotless Aircraft (GAPA) program of the U.S. Air Force, which was a supersonic guided missile system that preceded the Bomarc air defense missile.

According to its NRHP nomination, the site was "the birthplace of the United States Air Force supersonic missile flight test program."

References 

Military facilities on the National Register of Historic Places in Utah
Buildings and structures completed in 1946
Buildings and structures in Tooele County, Utah
National Register of Historic Places in Tooele County, Utah